Macunaíma  is a 1969 Brazilian comedy film directed by Joaquim Pedro de Andrade, based on Mário de Andrade's  novel of the same name. It was released in a dubbed version for American audiences in 1972 by New Line Cinema. On June 13 and July 12, 2005, European and Latin American syndicates of the TV5 network aired the film in its original Portuguese with French subtitles.  It was rereleased internationally in 2009.

Plot
Based on the 1928 book by Mário de Andrade, the modern-day parable follows the misadventures of a black man (Grande Otelo) who is miraculously born to an old woman (Paulo José), who is supposed to be of the indigenous peoples of Brasil, in the jungles of the Amazon. Though born fully-grown, he has the heart of a playful child. After the death of his mother, he comes face to face with a spring that turns him white (Paulo José). With that change, he and his two brothers move to Rio de Janeiro, but are interrogated by street terrorists upon their arrival.

Then, thanks to an affair with a white lady, guerrilla killer Ci (Dina Sfat), the film's hero fathers a black boy (Grande Otelo) with her. When both mother and child die, he embarks on a quest to recover a magical stone from a rich city dweller. In this film, the essentialist myth of the 3 Brazilian races, white, black, and the original natives of Brazil, is supposed to be represented through the protagonist, his brothers, and his mother.

Throughout his adventures, Macunaíma learns some tough lessons about Brazilian life and society. Macunaima functions as an allegorical representation of the turmoil of the Brazilian military coup that had ensued.

Cast
Grande Otelo as black Macunaíma
Paulo José as white Macunaíma/Macunaíma's mother
Dina Sfat as Ci
Jardel Filho as Wenceslau Pietro Pietra
Milton Gonçalves as Jigué
Rodolfo Arena as Maanape
Joana Fomm as Sofará
Maria do Rosário as Iriqui
Hugo Carvana 
Carmem Palhares
Wilza Carla
Zezé Macedo
Maria Lúcia Dahl
Myriam Muniz

References

External links
 Macunaima at the Internet Movie Database

1960s fantasy comedy films
1969 films
Brazilian fantasy comedy films
Epic films
Films based on Brazilian novels
Films directed by Joaquim Pedro de Andrade
Indigenous cinema in Latin America
1960s Portuguese-language films
1969 comedy films